Oetwil may refer to:

Oetwil am See, Switzerland
Oetwil an der Limmat, Switzerland